Margaret White may refer to:
Margaret White (judge) (born 1943), Australian judge
Margaret White (meteorologist) (1889–1977), British meteorologist and industrial researcher
Margaret White (Carrie), fictional character in Stephen King's novel Carrie
Margaret Bourke-White (1904–1971), American photographer
Peggy White (1924-1997), American pioneer in women's squash
Margaret Moore White (1902–1983), English gynaecologist

See also
White (surname)